Marvel's Storyboards is a documentary web television series by Marvel New Media hosted by Joe Quesada released on Marvel Entertainment YouTube channel on July 23, 2020. Originally, the series was going to be a 12-episode miniseries, but then it got pushed back from its original November 2019 release date and was split into two seasons.

Premise
The series follows Joe Quesada, executive vice president and creative director of Marvel Entertainment, as he explores into the stories and creative drives of storytellers from various backgrounds.

Episodes

Season 1 (2020)

Season 2 (2020)

Production

Development 
Joe Quesada took the idea where he interviewed Charlie Cox in 2017's San Diego Comic-Con and pitched it to Disney+ and they green lit as the series. In July 2020, Marvel Entertainment announced that the series moved from Disney+ to its YouTube channel and will premiere on July 23, 2020.

Filming 
Joe Quesada made the series practicipatory rather than one on one interviews. In the episode with Ed Viesturs, Joe went on "high altitude" mountain climbing in Idaho Mountains.

Guests
The first season hosted 12 guests. The marquee names include Hugh Jackman, Robert Lopez, Samhita Mukhopadhyay, Johnny Weir and Ed Viesturs.

Release
The series premiered on Marvel Entertainment YouTube channel on July 23, 2020, and ran for six episodes until August 27, 2020. The second season was released from November to December that same year.

References

External links 
 

2020s American documentary television series
English-language television shows
2020 American television series debuts
2020s YouTube series
Television series by Marvel Television